The Parkridge Polish Seniors Open was a men's senior (over 50) professional golf tournament on the European Seniors Tour, held at the Krakow Valley Golf and Country Club near Krzeszowice in southern Poland. It was held just once, in 2008, and was won by Ian Woosnam who finished a shot ahead of Domingo Hospital. The total prize fund was €280,000 with the winner receiving €42,000.

Winners

References

External links
Coverage on the European Senior Tour's official site

Former European Senior Tour events
Golf tournaments in Poland